NGC 5371 is a face-on spiral galaxy in the constellation Canes Venatici.  NGC 5371 (which also seems to be known as NGC 5390) is a symmetrical face-on Sbc barred spiral galaxy at a distance of 100 million light years.  This galaxy with Hickson Galaxy Group 68 makes up the Big Lick Galaxy Group.

References

External links

Intermediate spiral galaxies
Canes Venatici
5371
49514
08846